President's Office, George Washington University is a row of historic townhouses at 2003 G Street, Northwest, Washington, D.C. (also known as 700 20th Street, NW), in the Foggy Bottom neighborhood. They are now part of The George Washington University Law School.

History
The townhouses were designed by George S. Cooper and Victor Mendeleff, for
owner John W. Foster, and built by Theodore A. Harding, in 1892, in the Second Empire style. 
The townhouses were acquired by George Washington University, between 1928 and 1934, as a part of campus expansion, by Cloyd Heck Marvin. They were remodeled from 2000 to 2002.

The buildings are listed on the National Register of Historic Places.

References

Houses completed in 1892
Houses on the National Register of Historic Places in Washington, D.C.
Second Empire architecture in Washington, D.C.
George Washington University buildings and structures
Foggy Bottom
1892 establishments in Washington, D.C.